Nirmal Rishi is an Indian Punjabi film and television actress. She is most remembered for her role as Gulabo Maasi in her first movie Long Da Lishkara (1983). She is best known for appearing in Punjabi movies like Nikka Zaildar, Nikka Zaildar 2, Long Da Lishkara and The Great Sardar.

Early life and film career

Rishi was born in 1939 in a Brahman family in the village Khiva Kalan of Mansa district. Her father was Sarpanch Baldev Krishan Rishi and mother name was Bachni Devi. She was very passionate about theatre right from her school days. She chose to be a physical education instructor and joined Government College Patiala for Physical Education.

She acted in more than 60 films, including Long Da Lishkara (1983) Ucha Dar Babe Nanak Da (1985), Diva Bale Sari Raat, Suneha, Love Punjab (2015), Death on Wheels, Woman from the East, Nikka Zaildar (2016), Angrej (2015), Lahoriye (2017), and Nikka Zaildar 2 (2017) and a friendly appearance in Bollywood Superhit movie Dangal (2016).

Filmography

 Long Da Lishkara (1983).. Gulabo Maasi
 Ucha Dar Babe Nanak Da (1985).. Bhaago- Shamsher's sister
Sheran De Putt Sher (1990) .. Bachni
 Qurbani Jatt Di (1990).. Bhua
Jigra Jatt Da (1991) .. Bishan Kaur- Bakhtaawar's mother
 Diva Bale Sari Raat (1991).. Jindo
Ankhila Soorma (1993).. Tejo
Khel Taqdeeran De (1995).. Kauri
Mela (1997) .. Parsinn Kaur
Billian ch Baander (2007) .. Mrs Saroj Bakshi
Sat Sri Akal (2008)
Akhiyaan Udeekdian (2009).. Dilsher's Mother
Lakeeran (2016)
Panjaban -Love Rules Hearts (2010).. Karan's mother
 Woman from the East (2013).. Jeeto
Saadi Love Story (2013)
 Dilli 1984 (2014).. Vamp
Little Terrors (2014).. Grandmother
Oh My Pyo! (2014).. Binnu's Mother
 Angrej (2015).. Marho's grandmother
Darra (2016)
 Love Punjab (2016).. Pargat's Mother
 Nikka Zaildar (2016).. Daleep Kaur- Nikka's grandmother 
 Bambukat (2016).. Resham's mother
 Dangal (2016).. Cameo Appearance
 Lahoriye (2017).. Tej Parkash Kaur- Kikkar's mother
 Rabb Da Radio (2017).. Bebe Hardev Kaur
Arjan (2017).. Amro
Asli Punjab (2017)
The Great Sardaar (2017).. Sarpanch's Mother
KRAZZY TABBAR (2017).. Swarn Kaur
 Nikka Zaildar 2 (2017).. Deso Kaur- Nikka's Bebe
Bailaras (2017)
Ek Anokhi Dulhan - Saavi (2017)
Hard Kaur (2017) .. Satwant Kaur
Subedaar Joginder Singh (2018) .. Bibi Krishan Kaur
 Laung Laachi (2018) .. Ajaypal's daadi
 Daana Paani (2018).. Basant Kaur (old age)
Carry On Jatta 2 (2018) .. Lady at Marriage Beaureu
Kurmaiyan (2018) .. Ambo Jai Kaur
Parahuna (2018) .. Bhua
 Aate Di Chidi (2018)
 Afsar (2018)
Marriage Palace (2018)
 Rajma Chawal (2018).. Beeji / Bebe
 Bhajjo Veero Ve (2018)
Arjun Patiala (2019) Arjun's Mother
Aakhiri Waris (2019)
Vadda Kalakaar (2019)
Kaake Da Viyah (2019)
 Kala Shah Kala (2019)
Guddiyan Patole (2019) Nani
Who's Your Daddy?? (2020) as Biji
Paani Ch Madhaani (2021)
Saunkan Saunkne (2022)
 Bajre Da Sitta (2022)
 Ni Main Sass Kutni (2022)
 Sher Bagga (2022)
 Shakkar Paare (2022)
 Maa Da Ladla (2022)
 Mitran Da Naa Chalda'' (2023)

References

Actresses from Punjab, India
1943 births
Living people
Punjabi people
People from Mansa district, India
Indian film actresses
Indian television actresses
20th-century Indian actresses
21st-century Indian actresses
Recipients of the Sangeet Natak Akademi Award